Peter Heli (born 27 February 1969) is an Estonian skier and floorball player. He competed in the Nordic combined event at the 1992 Winter Olympics. Heli placed 11th in floorball at the 1996 World Championships.

References

External links
 

1969 births
Living people
Estonian male Nordic combined skiers
Olympic Nordic combined skiers of Estonia
Nordic combined skiers at the 1992 Winter Olympics
Estonian male biathletes
Sportspeople from Tallinn